De Jager v Sisana 1930 AD 71 is a South African appellate court case from 1930. It is an important case in the South African law of lease.

Decision 

A squatter called Sisana lived on a farm by arrangement with the owner, providing labour in return for occupation. The owner sold the land to de Jager, who was willing to keep the agreement going, but Sisana refused to work for the new owner and also refused to leave the land. The South African appellate court held that de Jager was entitled to evict Sisana since Sisana had lost tenancy rights by refusing to work for the new owner.

Significance 

De Jager v Sisana is an important case in the South African law of lease. The case established that rent is only payable in money or fruits of the property.

References

Further reading 
 
 

Appellate Division (South Africa) cases
1930 in case law
1930 in South African law
South African property case law
South African contract case law